Frank Mahony may refer to:

Frank P. Mahony (1862–1916), Australian artist
Frank Mahony (public servant) (1915–2000), Australian public servant and Director-General of ASIO

See also
Francis Sylvester Mahony, Irish humorist and journalist
Frank Mahoney (disambiguation)